David Bruce Jr. (February 6, 1802 – September 13, 1892) was a New York industrialist whose inventions revolutionized the printing industry.

Biography
David Bruce was born on Dey Street in Lower Manhattan on February 6, 1802.

In 1838, he invented the Pivotal Typecaster, and subsequently patented it in 1845.

An example of the Pivotal Typecaster can be found in the Printing Museum of the firm of William Clowes Ltd. in Beccles in the English county of Suffolk.

Bruce died at his home in Williamsburg, Brooklyn on September 13, 1892.

Notelist

References

19th-century American inventors
1802 births
1892 deaths
American printers